The Chaucer Review: A Journal of Medieval Studies and Literary Criticism is an academic journal published by the Penn State University Press. Founded in 1966 by Robert W. Frank, Jr. (who continued as editor through 2002) and Edmund Reiss, The Chaucer Review acts as a forum for the presentation and discussion of research and concepts about Chaucer and the literature of the Middle Ages.  The journal publishes studies of language, social and political contexts, aesthetics, and associated meanings of Chaucer's poetry, as well as articles on medieval literature, philosophy, theology, and mythography relevant to study of the poet and his contemporaries, predecessors, and audiences.

The Chaucer Review has been edited since 2001 by Susanna Fein (Kent State University) and David Raybin (Eastern Illinois University).  The four annual issues are published in January, April, July, and October and are distributed by the Johns Hopkins University Press.

External links 
 
 The Chaucer Review at Project MUSE
The Chaucer Review on the JHU Press website

Literary magazines published in the United States
Medieval studies literature
Literary criticism
European literature
British literature
Literature of England
Middle English literature
Quarterly journals
English-language journals
Publications established in 1966
Penn State University Press academic journals
Geoffrey Chaucer